Kappa Theta Epsilon Sorority is the first Greek-lettered sorority established and incorporated for LGBT professional and entrepreneurial women. Membership is exclusive to lesbian women, and primarily college-educated. The sorority was founded February 24, 2009, in Houston, Texas. The organization's founding tenets are sisterhood, fidelity, accomplishment and service.

History

Cultural context

The political climate of the early 21st century played a large role in the founding of Kappa Theta Epsilon Sorority, Incorporated.  Negative media portrayal of lesbians and gays, and the emergence of same-sex marriage as a recurring political issue, inspired the Sorority's Founder to consider a Sorority as a medium for creating change.

From the year 2000 to 2009, LGBT rights took a leading role in both politics and the justice system. Legally, the issue of marriage equality began to gain momentum, and laws criminalizing homosexuality were being overturned. Kappa Theta Epsilon's founder believed that a group of young leaders could advocate for more equitable policies in both the legislative and judicial arenas.

Sorority establishment

The sorority was founded on the morning of February 24, 2009, in Houston, Texas. After researching existing organizations, it was decided that the group would adopt the letters Kappa Theta Epsilon (ΚΘΕ) to reflect its fundamental ideals. On February 25, the sorority's official colors and mascot were finalized.

Other symbols adopted in the early stages of the sorority were the founding tenets, flower and jewel. It was agreed in September 2009 that, for the first two years, development of infrastructure would take precedence over the initiation of new members.

Philanthropy and programming

Service philosophy

Kappa Theta Epsilon states that through its philosophy of "servant leadership", members have a direct impact on the conditions of their community and world. The sorority follows a five target platform for philanthropy, designed to address problems affecting women globally, with emphasis on lesbian women of African descent.

The sorority focuses its efforts on five philanthropic target areas:

Every two years, KTE selects a focus area and members devote the majority of their community service efforts to projects related to it.

Chapters

See also
List of social fraternities and sororities
List of LGBT and LGBT-friendly fraternities and sororities

References

External links
Kappa Theta Epsilon Sorority, Incorporated Official Website
The Ladder magazine, an official national publication of Kappa Theta Epsilon

2009 establishments in Texas
Fraternities and sororities in the United States
Lesbian organizations in the United States
LGBT fraternities and sororities
Student organizations established in 2009
Women's rights organizations
LGBT in Texas